Bartosz Adam Arłukowicz (born 31 December 1971 in Resko) is a Polish center-left politician and pediatrician who has been serving as a Member of the European Parliament since 2019. He served as a Minister of Health from 18 October 2011 to 10 June 2015 under Donald Tusk and then Ewa Kopacz and was a member of Sejm from 2007.

Political career

Career in national politics
From 2004 Arłukowicz was a member of Social Democracy of Poland, then parliamentary group Social Democracy of Poland - New Left from April to December 2008, then Left Wing from 2009 to 2011 and then Labour United (its leader claims he became a member in 2009, Arłukowicz says he finally did not fill in the declaration). From 2009 till 2010 he was a vice-chairman of special parliamentary commission meant to investigate so-called gambling afera. After resigning he was installed on newly created chair Prime Minister's plenipotentiary responsible for encountering social exclusion. 

In October 2011 Arłukowicz started his governmental career after previous minister Ewa Kopacz was chosen Marshal of the Sejm and his seat was liquidated. In 2013 he became a member of Civic Platform. In June 2015, he announced his resignation from ministerial function following the tape crisis (due to it three ministers and Marshall of the Sejm were forced to resign even though Arłukowicz was not personally involved or recorded). He was replaced by cardiac surgeon Marian Zembala.

Member of the European Parliament, 2019–present
In parliament, Arłukowicz serves on the Committee on the Environment, Public Health and Food Safety. From 2020 to 2021 he also chaired the Special Committee on Beating Cancer.

In addition to his committee assignments, Arłukowicz is part of the parliament’s delegations for relations with the countries of Central America and to the Euro-Latin American Parliamentary Assembly.

Bibliography
 Bartosz Arłukowicz's page on Sejm website

References

1971 births
People from Łobez County
Polish pediatricians
Physicians from Szczecin
Health ministers of Poland
Living people
21st-century Polish physicians
20th-century Polish physicians
Labour Union (Poland) politicians
Members of the Polish Sejm 2007–2011
Members of the Polish Sejm 2011–2015
MEPs for Poland 2019–2024